Perumbur IInd Sethi is a village in the Thanjavur taluk of Thanjavur district, Tamil Nadu, India.

Demographics 

As per the 2001 census, Perumbur IInd Sethi had a total population of 1316 with 644 males and 672 females. The sex ratio was 1043. The literacy rate was 76.42.

References 

 

Villages in Thanjavur district